The 1980 Robinsons South Pacific Classic was an Association of Tennis Professionals men's tournament held on outdoor grass courts at the Milton Courts in Brisbane, Queensland, Australia that was part of the  1980 Grand Prix tennis circuit. It was the seventh edition of the tournament and was held from 6 October until 12 October 1980. First-seeded John McEnroe won the singles title.

Finals

Singles
 John McEnroe defeated  Phil Dent 6–3, 6–4
 It was McEnroe's 6th singles title of the year and the 21st of his career.

Doubles
 John McEnroe /  Matt Mitchell defeated  Phil Dent /  Rod Frawley 8–6

Notes

References

External links
 ITF tournament details

Robinsons South Pacific Championships
Robinsons South Pacific Championships, 1980
Robinsons South Pacific Championships
Robinsons South Pacific Championships
Sports competitions in Brisbane
Tennis in Queensland